Meekness is an attribute of human nature and behavior that has been defined as an amalgam of righteousness, inner humility, and patience.

Meekness has been contrasted with humility alone insomuch as humility simply refers to an attitude towards oneself—a restraining of one's own power so as to allow room for others—whereas meekness refers to the treatment of others.

Christianity 

 As Jesus was being crucified He prayed for those who were in the process of executing Him, saying: “Father, forgive them, for they do not know what they do.” Luke 23:34
 The Apostle Paul gave an example of meek behavior when writing to Timothy: "The servant of the Lord must be gentle, apt to teach, patient, in meekness instructing those that oppose themselves." (2 Tim. 2:24–25)
 Sir Thomas Browne explained: "Meekness takes injuries like pills, not chewing, but swallowing them down." This indicates that meekness allows a person to overlook or forgive perceived insults or offenses.
 The meek feature in the Beatitudes, and were linked thereby to the classical virtue of magnanimity by Aquinas.
 John Stott stated that "Meekness is the mean between being too angry and never being angry at all. It is not a synonym for weakness... it is the gentleness of the strong, whose strength is under control."

Other traditions 
Buddhism, like Christianity, strongly values meekness–the Buddha himself (in an earlier life) featuring as the "Preacher of Meekness" who patiently had his limbs lopped off by a jealous king without complaining.
Taoism valorized the qualities of submission and non-contention.
 Book of Numbers chapter 12 verse 3: Now the man Moses was very meek, above all the men which were upon the face of the earth.
 In Islam, faqr, sometimes translated as "poverty", is one of the central attitudes in a  Faqeer. It was also one of the attributes of the Prophet. He said "faqr is my pride". In a spiritual sense, faqr is defined as the absence of desire for wealth, recognition or for the blessings of the otherworld. One of the aspects of one who has embodied the true essence of faqr, is that the mystic will never ask anything of anyone else. The reason for this is for one to ask someone else for anything they would be relying on a created being. To receive something from that same being would produce gratitude in the heart which would be geared toward the giver, not towards God.

Animal analogues
The classical Greek word used to translate meekness was that for a horse that had been tamed and bridled.
The buffalo was to the Buddhists a lesson in meekness.

Literary examples
Meekness is used to characterise the nature of Tess in Tess of the D'Urbervilles.
The Heroine of Possession: A Romance judges the hero as "a gentle and unthreatening being. Meek, she thought drowsily, turning out the light. Meek."

Criticism 
Beethoven rejected meekness and equality in favor of cultural elitism: “Power is the moral principle of those who excel others”.
Nietzsche rejected meekness as part of a parasitic revolt by the low against the lofty, the manly, and the high.

See also 
 Gandhi
 Jesus
 Passive resistance
 Patient Griselda
 Quakers
 Seven virtues

Further reading

References 

Christian ethics
Religious ethics
Virtue